Star Trek is a science fiction media franchise that began with Gene Roddenberry's launch of the original Star Trek television series in 1966. Its success led to decades of films, novels, comics, and spinoff series. A major motif of the franchise involves encounters with various alien races throughout the galaxy. These fictional races are listed here.

Noted Star Trek races include Vulcans, Klingons, and the Borg. Some aspects of these fictional races became well known in American pop culture, such as the Vulcan salute and the Borg phrase, "Resistance is futile."

Star Trek aliens have been featured in Time magazine, which described how they are essential to the franchise's narrative.

Key

A

B

C

D

E

F

G

H

J

K

Kazon

The Kazon aliens were introduced on Star Trek: Voyager.

Kelpien
The Kelpiens lived on the terrestrial planet Kaminar, the earth from which Commander Saru hailed in Star Trek: Discovery. The Ba'al suppressed the Kelpiens for many generations. This race used its technological superiority to feast upon the Kelpien people and prevent them from experiencing Va'Harai and gaining greater consciousness. In S2E7 of Discovery, "Light and Shadows," the Kelpiens, with the help of an energy source associated with the Red Angel, all experienced Va'Harai. They lost their innate fear of the Ba'al. After that, they plan to live in peace with their former tormentors.

Klingon

The Klingons are a warrior race. Their popularity is strong for a fictional race, and they had real language written for them that is spoken in the real world, unique among science fiction aliens.

Kzinti

The Kzinti are feline warriors that appear in the TAS episode The Slaver Weapon, who originated in Larry Niven's Known Space universe. The Kzinti had four wars with humanity. According to Sulu, the last one was 200 years before their appearance in the episode. In the STP episode Nepenthe, Riker says that Kzinti are present on the titular planet.

O

Organian
The Organians are incorporeal energy creatures ("pure energy, pure thought") with no precise physical location in the universe. After the climax of the episode "Errand of Mercy," Spock comments that they are "as far above us on the evolutionary scale as we are above the amoeba."  They assumed humanoid form to "interact" with the Federation representatives and the Klingons. They render all weapons belonging to the opposing parties inoperable through extreme heat and then vanish.

The Organians were a race of beings who had evolved into pure conceptual beings, the essence of thought with no human bodies. In some ways, they were similar to Q for power levels and abilities. In the novel Q Strike, the Organians appear to observe a battle between members of the Q Continuum and other seemingly omnipotent beings from the Star Trek universe. The original Q identifies them after being asked by Captain Jean-Luc Picard who they are and is rather dismissive, remarking that "compared to their code of noninvolvement, your Prime Directive is practically an incitement to riot."

The Organians also appeared on Star Trek: Enterprise in the episode "Observer Effect," where they observed members of the crew infected with a silicon-based virus to decide whether or not they should make first contact with humans. They did not technically appear onscreen; they only manifested themselves by possessing the bodies of several members of the Enterprise crew.

In 2017, Den of Geek ranked Organians the 20th best aliens of the Star Trek franchise. In 2020, ScreenRant ranked them the 5th smartest aliens of the Star Trek franchise.

Orion

Orions are a green-skinned, humanoid alien species in the Star Trek universe.  An Orion was first portrayed as an illusion in the original Star Trek pilot. Still, he was seen in the broadcast series when this original pilot was incorporated into a two-part episode (episodes 11 and 12) in the first season.  Orions have also been portrayed in Star Trek: The Animated Series, Star Trek: Deep Space Nine, Star Trek: Voyager and Star Trek: Enterprise. Rachel Nichols played Orion Starfleet cadet Gaila in the 2009 Star Trek film.

P

Q

Q

R

S

Son'a

Once members of the neo-luddite race the Ba'ku, the Son'a were exiled from their home planet by their fellows for trying to overthrow the leadership and embracing more advanced technology. Now separated from the rejuvenating properties of the Ba'ku planet, they attempt to avoid death through medical procedures. The Son'a use of technology, including weaponry, was banned within the Federation. Nonetheless, in 2375 the Federation allied with the Son'a to take advantage of their technology to gather rejuvenating 'metaphasic particles' emanating from the rings of the Ba'ku planet, which is in Federation space. After the operation, which involved the forced relocation or genocide of the Ba'ku, was called into question and stopped by the crew of the Enterprise, a number of the Son'a reintegrated into the Ba'ku population. Others later joined the Dominion. The Son'a have subjugated two peoples as their slaves: the Ellora and the Tarlac.

Species 8472

Species 8472 appeared in four episodes of Star Trek: Voyager. While passing through Borg space, Voyager encounters Species 8472, a race that surpasses the Borg in combat prowess.

T

Talaxian
On Star Trek: Voyager, the ship's cook Neelix is a Talaxian, first appearing in "Caretaker".

In 2017, Den of Geek ranked Talaxians the 21st best aliens of the Star Trek franchise.

Tellarite
The Tellarites first appeared in "Journey to Babel." They have a facial appearance created by having the actors wearing converted pig masks. Culturally, they are known for their love of arguing and blunt, forceful speech, which most other cultures would consider rude; if Tellarite speech is answered in kind, they will typically consider it an honor. A Tellarite also appears in "Whom Gods Destroy" and "The Lights of Zetar" and in the animated episode "The Time Trap."

Tellarites did not appear in the TNG-era shows, but on Enterprise they are a significant part of several episodes, becoming one of the founding species of the United Federation of Planets. They also appear in Discovery, in which Gorch, a Tellarite Starfleet admiral, is depicted. The animated series Lower Decks depicted a Tellarite captain in the episode "Moist Vessel." In the animated series  Prodigy one of the main characters, Jankom Pog, is a 16-year-old Tellarite.

In 2017, Den of Geek ranked Tellarites the 25th best aliens of the Star Trek franchise.

Talosians
These appeared in "The Cage" pilot and "The Menagerie" and are noted for their powers of illusion.

In 2017, Den of Geek ranked Talosians the 16th best aliens of the Star Trek franchise.

Tholian
The Tholians are an extremely xenophobic, non-humanoid hermaphroditic species with a propensity for precision. They first appear in the original series episode, "The Tholian Web," where Spock remarks when fired upon by the Tholians: "The renowned Tholian punctuality."  Tholian biology required high temperatures around 480 Kelvin (207 °C, 404 °F). They could tolerate lower temperatures for a brief period; if they were exposed to temperatures around 380 Kelvin or less, their carapace would crack. This was painful or distressing; a Tholian subjected to such a temperature regime could be coerced to cooperate. In temperatures even lower, a Tholian would freeze solid and shatter. (ENT: "Future Tense," "In a Mirror, Darkly")

Tribble
Tribbles are a small, harmless species noted primarily for their ability to reproduce extremely quickly. For never revealed reasons, they are hated by (and hate) the Klingons. Three Star Trek television episodes featured them: "The Trouble with Tribbles" (1967), "More Tribbles, More Troubles" (1973) and "Trials and Tribble-ations" (1996).

Trill
The Trill are a humanoid species. A small minority, after a rigorous selection process, are permitted to join with a sentient, intelligent symbiont. The symbiont is long-lived and can pass from host to host, carrying all the prior host's memories, skills, and experiences. Trill symbionts are also capable of joining with human hosts.

The Trill made their debut on television in the Star Trek: The Next Generation episode "The Host" (May 11, 1991), and were further developed in Star Trek: Deep Space Nine. The Trill Jadzia Dax is the 8th host of the symbiont Dax, and together they are one of the main characters of Deep Space Nine for the first six seasons; when Jadzia is killed, Ezri Dax, becomes the next Dax host for the seventh and final season. This species was also briefly represented as a holonovel character corresponding to Ensign Harry Kim on Star Trek: Voyager in "Author, Author" (April 18, 2001).

Adira Tal, a human joined with a Trill symbiont, appears in the third season of Star Trek: Discovery. A Trill doctor, Naáshala Kunamadéstifee, appears in Star Trek: Picard, and several Trill also feature in Lower Decks.

Trill have been studied in analyzing the biology of Star Trek, especially regarding the symbionts.

There are two contrasting concepts for Trill. One is that a symbiont is essentially an alien person; nonetheless, the joined Trill still mixes the original person with the memories and some of the personality of the symbiont. Only a tiny percentage of Trill are joined, and being accepted for the process is considered an honor. For joined Trill, a symbiont's memories, and to some extent personality, are synthesized with the existing Trill's character. Joined Trill have been studied in the philosophies of Star Trek, in particular, whether a person is essentially the sum of their memories (the philosopher Locke's "memory theory"). This concept was explored in the Star Trek: Deep Space Nine television episode "Dax." (see )

The contrasting philosophy of the symbiont is called "functionalism," according to Star Trek and Philosophy: The Wrath of Kant, in which people are defined by their actions as opposed to memories. The symbionts have been dismissed as "just memories" rather than an actual person, although in other cases they are described as a "sentient symbiotic organism."

V

Vidiian

The Vidiians are encountered in the Delta Quadrant by Voyager.

Vorta

Vorta are a member race of the Dominion. One family of then-primitive Vorta once saved one of the Changelings, the rulers of the Dominion. For this, they were genetically engineered into an intelligent species thoroughly loyal to the Changelings and, since then, acted as Dominion administrators, field commanders, scientists, and diplomats. They have direct authority over the Jem'Hadar and are tasked with dispensing doses of Ketracel White to them.

In 2017, Den of Geek ranked the Vorta the 15th best aliens of the Star Trek franchise.

Vulcan

Vulcans are an advanced, brilliant, warp-capable humanoid species from the planet Vulcan. In the past, they were emotional and highly violent until the philosopher Surak convinced most of them to strive to suppress their emotions. War broke out between Surak's followers and those who refused to accept his teachings. Eventually, the latter left Vulcan; one of these factions became the Romulans.

While modern Vulcans still feel emotions, they consider it shameful to display or be governed by them. They seek to act by logic alone.

X

See also
 List of fictional extraterrestrials

References

Further reading

External links

Star Trek aliens
 
aliens